The Ulu Jelai Power Station is a hydroelectric power station located in the district of Cameron Highlands, Pahang, Malaysia. It is one of the entry point projects under the Economic Transformation Programme.

Location
The project is located approximately 150 km north of Kuala Lumpur. The nearest town is Ringlet, 40 km away. The power station is accessible from Federal Route 102 connecting the towns of Ringlet and Sungai Koyan. It is located within Ulu Jelai and Bukit Jerut forest reserves, near Cameron Highlands-Lipis district border.

About the Power Station 
The power station has a maximum generating capacity of 382 MW. Water from 3 rivers - Sungai Bertam, Sungai Telom and Sungai Lemoi is used for electricity generation. A dam is built to impound Sungai Bertam. Weirs and diversion tunnels are built on Sungai Telom and Sungai Lemoi to divert water into the main reservoir at Sungai Bertam. From the reservoir, water is channeled into a series of tunnels 15 km-long to generate electricity before being released back into Sungai Telom.

The power cavern houses 2 units of Francis turbines each with a generating capacity of 191 MW.

Construction
TM-Salini Consortium has been appointed as the main contractor. Construction commenced in March 2011. The 88m-high roller compacted concrete (RCC) dam on Sungai Bertam was built after Sungai Bertam has been successfully diverted. The RCC mix is of low cementitious content and aggregates were sourced from a nearby quarry.

All tunnels and caverns were excavated using drill and blast method except for the diversion tunnels which utilised a 3m-diameter tunnel boring machine. Lining of tunnels depended upon the rock conditions and water pressure - concrete and steel are used as lining materials. The surge shaft was excavated using the raised boring technique. Unit 1 is expected to be commissioned in December 2015 while Unit 2 in March 2016.

The construction of this project resulted in the relocation of 3 orang Asli villages - Kampung Susu, Kampung Tiat and Kampung Pinang.

The reservoir impounding started on 18 January 2016 and reach the full supply level on 16 May 2016.

Unit 2 was the first unit being commissioned due to some issues with the commissioning of Unit 1. Commercial operation of Unit 2 was at 0000 hours on 15 August 2016.

Issues
Sedimentation is a major issue for Sungai Bertam and Sungai Telom due to uncontrolled clearing of land. A check dam has been constructed upstream of the main reservoir on Sungai Bertam. The check dam is able to reduce the amount of sediment entering the reservoir and prolonging the reservoir life. A desanding system has been constructed at the intake of Sungai Telom for the same purpose.

See also

List of power stations in Malaysia
Environmental concerns with electricity generation
Environmental issues in Malaysia

References

Cameron Highlands
Hydroelectric power stations in Malaysia
Dams in Malaysia
Gravity dams